Saraga is a suburb of Port Moresby, the capital city of Papua New Guinea.

Suburbs of Port Moresby